Andrei Nikolayevich Gubernsky (born 20 January 1970) is a former Russian football player.

References

1970 births
Living people
Soviet footballers
FC FShM Torpedo Moscow players
FC Asmaral Moscow players
Russian footballers
Russian Premier League players
Association football forwards